Initiation is a rite of passage marking entrance or acceptance into a group or society.

Anthropology
 Bora (Australian), both an initiation ceremony of Indigenous Australians, and the site on which the initiation is performed
 Buddhist initiation ritual, the public ordination ceremony wherein a lay student of Buddhism receives certain Buddhist precepts
 Hazing, refers to the practice of rituals, challenges, and other activities involving harassment, abuse or humiliation used as a way of initiating a person into a group including a new fraternity, sorority, team, or club
 Initiation (guru), a diksha, or giving of a mantra or an initiation by the guru in Indian religions
 Initiation (Theosophy), a concept about the levels of spiritual development
 Initiation ritual (mafia),  a ceremony involving significant ritual, oaths, blood, and an agreement
 Masonic initiation rituals, part of the Masonic ritual and symbolism
 Ndut initiation rite,  a rite of passage as well as a religious education commanded by Serer religion
 Rite of Christian Initiation of Adults, a process developed by the Catholic Church for prospective converts to Catholicism who are above the age of infant baptism
 Sacraments of initiation, three rites that introduce a person into the Christian Church

Arts, entertainment, and media

Films
 The Initiation (film), a 1984 American slasher film directed by Larry Stewart
 Initiation (1987 film), an Australian adventure drama thriller film
 Initiation (2020 film), an American horror film

Literature
 The Initiation (novel), a young adult novel by L. J. Smith
 Initiation, a book by Elisabeth Haich

Music
 Initiation (Todd Rundgren album), 1975
 Initiation (Tommy Emmanuel album), 1995, or the title song
 Initiation (Course of Empire album), 1994
 Initiation (Rhea's Obsession album), 1996
 Initiation (TheStart album), 2004
 The Initiation (album), a 2001 album by X-Raided
 "Initiation", a song from AFI's album The Art of Drowning
 "Initiation", a song from The Weeknd's mixtape Echoes of Silence

Television
 "Initiation" (The Office), an episode
 Initiation (Justice League Unlimited), an episode
 Initiation (Kung Fu: The Legend Continues), the pilot episode
 "Initiations" (Star Trek: Voyager), an episode of Star Trek: Voyager
 "The Initiation", an episode of Alfred Hitchcock Presents (1987)
 "The Initiation", an episode of Bonanza (1972)
 "The Initiation", an episode of Southie Rules (2013)
 "The Initiation", an episode of The Adventures of Ozzie and Harriet (1954)
 "The Initiation", an episode of Margie (1961)
 "The Initiation", an episode of Joe's World (1979)
 "The Initiation", an episode of The Young Riders (1991)
 "The Initiation", an episode of Mr. Belvedere (1987)
 "The Initiation", an episode of It's About Time (1966)
 "The Initiation", an episode of The Lost World (2002)
 "The Initiation", an episode of First Night (1963)
 "The Initiation", an episode of The Edison Twins (1986)
 "The Initiation", an episode of Honey Lane (1967)
 "The Initiation", an episode of Stingers (1998)
 "The Initiation", an episode of Look Up and Live (1965)
 "The Initiation", an episode of The FBI Files (2003)
 "The Initiation", an episode of The Molly Wopsies (1976)

Chemistry and medicine
Initiation (chemistry), a chemical reaction that triggers one or more secondary reactions
 Initiation, the process of beginning gene transcription
 Initiation as beginning of gene translation
 Initiation factor, proteins that bind to the small subunit of the ribosome during the initiation of translation
 Prokaryotic initiation factors, IF1, IF2, and IF3
 Abortive initiation, an early process of genetic transcription
 Chain initiation, the beginning of chain-growth polymerization
 Tumor initiation, the first phase in tumor development
 Initiation (phonetics), the production of airflow by the airstream mechanism in the vocal tract

Technology
 Session Initiation Protocol,  a telecommunications protocol for signaling and controlling multimedia communication sessions
 Project Initiation Documentation,  information which was acquired through the Starting up a Project and Initiating a Project in a PRINCE2 controlled project environment

See also
 Initiate (disambiguation)
 Initiator (disambiguation)